The Shellsport G8 International Series was a Formula Libre motor racing competition held in the United Kingdom. Contested in both 1976 and 1977, the series catered for Formula One, Formula Two, Formula 5000 and Formula Atlantic cars competing together in the same races.

Champions

References

External links
 Statistics from Driver Database

Auto racing series in the United Kingdom